Sensually Primitive is a full-length studio album released under the pseudonym Mr Libido by Mattias Eklundh of the progressive metal band Freak Kitchen. The album was released in 1996 after being recorded in mid to late 1995, as the artist states, "...in bed-rooms, basements, living-rooms & kitchens on Mother Earth".

The musical style of the album is very experimental and could sometimes easy be classified as strange.
The album is unusual because it doesn't feature a single tone of guitar although Mattias Eklundh is a guitarist known for his high technical level of guitar playing.

Track listing
"The Serious Musician"
"How Are We Feeling Today?"
"Big Ugly Secret"
"Daddy's Box of No-No's"
"Your Left Arm"
"Train Leaves at 04:00"
"Techno Moron"
"Not That Kind of Bird"
"Herbert the Pervert"
"Dead on Arrival"
"Sit on My Face"
"I Thought It Was a Horse"
"Hard to the Core"
"Sensually Primitive"
"Bit of King"

Personnel
Mr Libido – vocals and all instruments

References 

1996 albums